Alen Vučkić (born 1 February 1990) is a Slovenian football defender.

Club career
Vučkić began his career in Domžale. He can play as left back, central defender or as defensive midfielder.

In March 2010 he has signed a three-year contract with another Slovenian club, Olimpija.

International career
Vučkić was a member of the Slovenia under-21 team, where he played alongside his younger brother Haris Vučkić.

Personal life
He is the older brother of Haris Vučkić, who currently plays at Spanish football club Zaragoza.

References

External links
 
 Player profile at NZS 

1990 births
Living people
Footballers from Ljubljana
Slovenian people of Bosnia and Herzegovina descent
Slovenian footballers
Association football fullbacks
NK Domžale players
NK Olimpija Ljubljana (2005) players
NK Krka players
Slovenian PrvaLiga players
Slovenia under-21 international footballers
Slovenia youth international footballers